Hernán Jesús Velásquez Núñez (born 29 October 1965) is a Chilean sociologist who was elected as a member of the Chilean Constitutional Convention.

In 2013, he helped in the presidential campaign of Marco Enríquez-Ominami.

References

External links
 

1965 births
Living people
Party for Democracy (Chile) politicians
Social Green Regionalist Federation politicians
21st-century Chilean politicians
University of Antofagasta alumni
Members of the Chilean Constitutional Convention
People from El Loa Province